Redberry or Red Berry may refer to:

 Rhamnus crocea, a Northwest American shrub in the buckthorn family
 Vaccinium vitis-idaea, commonly called lingonberry or cowberry
 Red Berry (Texas politician) (1899–1969), member of Texas House of Representatives and Senate
 Red Berry (wrestler) (1906–1973), American professional wrestler
 Redberry Lake (Saskatchewan)
 Rural Municipality of Redberry No. 435, Saskatchewan, Canada
 Redberry (electoral district), a former electoral district in Saskatchewan, Canada
 RedBerry, a competitor to the BlackBerry wireless e-mail device in China

See also
 Redberry mite, a pest that plagues commercial blackberry growers in the United States
 Redberry moonseed
 Red olive berry
 Raspberry
 Redcurrant
 Strawberry
 Ardisia crenata